Chlorida festiva is a species of beetle in the family Cerambycidae. It was described by Carl Linnaeus in his landmark 1758 10th edition of Systema Naturae. It is known from southeastern United States, Central America, South America, and the West Indies. Adult males produce (6E,8Z)-6,8-pentadecadienal, an attractant pheromone. In Puerto Rico the larvae are known to be leaf mining pests of mango crops.

References

Bothriospilini
Beetles described in 1758
Beetles of North America
Beetles of South America
Taxa named by Carl Linnaeus